Gregg Botterman (born 1968) is a former rugby union hooker for premiership team Saracens, as well as London Welsh and Old Albanians. 

He acted as the first choice hooker during Saracens' entry into professionalism and played as Saracens won the Tetley's bitter cup. As a Saracens youth player he received particular note for playing on against Orrell R.U.F.C. despite multiple broken ribs.

Botterman finished his professional rugby career in 2004, but remained involved in rugby with a 9 year stint as both player and part-time coach with Old Albanians. This stint would also include a game with the Barbarians against East Midlands, coming on as a replacement during a 48-17 victory.

His niece, Hannah Botterman is a Saracens and England prop, starting for both aged 18 after being introduced to rugby aged 4 by her uncle and aunt (Jane Everett - also an English prop).

References

1968 births
Living people
English rugby union players
London Welsh RFC players
Rugby union hookers
Rugby union players from Welwyn Garden City
Saracens F.C. players